Ametastegia is a genus of common sawflies in the family Tenthredinidae. There are about 16 described species in Ametastegia.

Species
These 16 species belong to the genus Ametastegia:

 Ametastegia albipes (Thomson, 1871)
 Ametastegia aperta (Norton, 1861)
 Ametastegia armillata (Konow, 1905)
 Ametastegia articulata (Klug, 1818)
 Ametastegia becra Smith
 Ametastegia carpini (Hartig, 1837)
 Ametastegia equiseti (Fallen, 1808)
 Ametastegia formosana (Rohwer, 1916)
 Ametastegia glabrata (Fallen) (dock sawfly)
 Ametastegia lacteilabris (Costa, 1894)
 Ametastegia pallipes (Spinola) (violet sawfly)
 Ametastegia perla (Klug, 1818)
 Ametastegia persica Khayrandish, Talebi & Blank, 2015
 Ametastegia tener (Fallén, 1808)
 Ametastegia tenera (Fallen, 1808)
 Ametastegia xenia Smith

References

Further reading

External links

 

Tenthredinidae
Articles created by Qbugbot